Graham Polak (born 16 June 1984) is a former Australian rules footballer who played for the Fremantle Football Club and the Richmond Football Club in the Australian Football League (AFL).

Fremantle career
Polak began his AFL career with the Fremantle Football Club after being drafted from East Fremantle in the WAFL with the fourth selection in the 2001 AFL Draft (behind future stars of the game Luke Hodge, Luke Ball and Chris Judd.) He made his debut in round 1, 2002 in a Western Derby against the West Coast Eagles which Fremantle lost. In 2003 he had his best season to date, only missing one game (round 3) and playing in Fremantle's first ever finals match.  He was nominated for the AFL Rising Star award in Round 9 and finished second in the end of year voting behind Sam Mitchell and ahead of Luke Ball and Daniel Wells.

Polak only played 12 games in 2005 and failed to improve due to a pre-season injury. He was recalled in round 3 of 2006, and due to injuries to Aaron Sandilands and Justin Longmuir, was often played in the new role of a ruckman, but still only managed 11 games for the season, and was overlooked for the finals.

Richmond career
On 13 October 2006, Polak was traded to the Richmond Football Club following speculation all week that he would be the key to the mega deal involving Collingwood's Chris Tarrant being traded to the Dockers. Since being at the Tigers, Polak has mainly played at centre-half back and finished seventh in Richmond's 2007 best and fairest award after playing in all 22 games for the season.

Tram collision
Late on 28 June 2008, Polak was struck by a Melbourne tram, and was placed in an induced coma with bruising to the brain, putting his football career in jeopardy.
Two days after being struck by the tram Polak was able to respond to commands and squeeze a family member's hand. The hospital has stated that the signs are 'encouraging'. Nearly a week after being hit by a tram Polak was moved to Epworth Rehabilitation Centre. He was then able to remember parts of the game he played against Carlton the day of his accident and was able to recognise loved ones and speak.

In late 2008, Richmond applied to the AFL to transfer Polak to the rookie list, primarily to free up a position on their senior list that would enable them to recruit Ben Cousins as well as re-draft David Gourdis.  The AFL rejected this request, but Richmond still managed to select both players, Cousins in the Pre-season draft and Gourdis in the rookie draft. Polak returned to training during the 2009 pre-season and was selected to play in a NAB Challenge practice match against St Kilda.

Polak was named to make his return to the AFL in the Round 21 match against Hawthorn, nearly 13 months after being struck by the tram.

Comeback
At the end of the 2009 season Polak was de-listed by the Tigers. He was then re drafted by the Tigers in the 2009 rookie draft as a mature aged rookie.
On 26 June 2010 and 31 July 2010 Polak suffered concussion while playing for Coburg in the VFL, again putting his football career in jeopardy.

Retirement
On 27 August 2010 Polak announced his retirement from AFL football.  He returned to Perth to play in the West Australian Football League, but transferred from East Fremantle to East Perth.  After suffering from further on-field head injuries, he retired from all football in June 2011.

External links

References

1984 births
East Fremantle Football Club players
Fremantle Football Club players
Richmond Football Club players
Coburg Football Club players
East Perth Football Club players
Living people
Australian rules footballers from Geraldton
Australian people of Polish descent